The 2017 Mercedes-Benz Challenge is the seventh season of the Mercedes-Benz Challenge.

Entry list
 CLA AMG Cup drivers compete utilising the Mercedes-Benz CLA AMG while C250 Cup drivers use the Mercedes-Benz C250. All drivers were Brazilian-registered, excepting Jared Wilson, who raced under American racing license, and João Lemos, who raced under Portuguese racing license.

Race calendar and results
All races were held in Brazil.

Championship standings
Points system
Points are awarded for each race at an event to the driver/s of a car that completed at least 75% of the race distance and was running at the completion of the race.

Race: Used for the first to seventh round.
Final race: Used for the last round of the season with double points.

Drivers' Championship

References

External links
  

Mercedes-Benz Challenge seasons
Mercedes-Benz Challenge